Machete Hook is the low-tide elevation spit wide 70 m and projecting from the small peninsula ending in Siddins Point 830 m eastwards into Vasilev Bay in Hero Bay on the north coast of Livingston Island in the South Shetland Islands, Antarctica. Bulgarian topographic survey Tangra 2004/05. The area was visited by early 19th century sealers.

The feature is so named because of its shape supposedly resembling a machete.

Location
British mapping in 1968 and Bulgarian in 2009 and 2017.

Maps
 Livingston Island to King George Island. Scale 1:200000. Admiralty Nautical Chart 1776. Taunton: UK Hydrographic Office, 1968
 South Shetland Islands. Scale 1:200000 topographic map No. 3373. DOS 610 - W 62 58. Tolworth, UK, 1968
 L. Ivanov. Antarctica: Livingston Island and Greenwich, Robert, Snow and Smith Islands. Scale 1:120000 topographic map. Troyan: Manfred Wörner Foundation, 2010.  (First edition 2009. )
 L. Ivanov. Antarctica: Livingston Island and Smith Island. Scale 1:100000 topographic map. Manfred Wörner Foundation, 2017. 
 Antarctic Digital Database (ADD). Scale 1:250000 topographic map of Antarctica. Scientific Committee on Antarctic Research (SCAR). Since 1993, regularly upgraded and updated

Notes

References
 Bulgarian Antarctic Gazetteer. Antarctic Place-names Commission. (details in Bulgarian, basic data in English)

External links
 Machete Hook. Adjusted Copernix satellite image

Landforms of Livingston Island
Bulgaria and the Antarctic
Spits of Antarctica